New York State Route 146A (NY 146A) is a state highway in New York State. It begins at NY 146 in Clifton Park and ends at NY 50 in Ballston Lake. It is located entirely within Saratoga County. Route 146A is the last existing spur of NY 146 in Saratoga and Schenectady counties.

Route description

A two-lane highway, NY 146A heads northward as Vischer Ferry Road from a four-way intersection with NY 146 at Vischer Ferry Road (County Route 90 or CR 90), which continues southward from that intersection to Crescent Road (CR 92) in Vischer Ferry. After passing over a railway, NY 146A turns westward and becomes Ballson Lake Road, passing by the Van Patten Golf Course and a link to Ushers. After crossing Ashdown Road, NY 146A turns northward, descending into the hamlet of Ballston Lake, where it has a railroad crossing. After passing the eastern terminus of CR 339, it becomes Midline Road, heading northward to its eventual terminus at NY 50.

History
In 1908, the New York State Legislature created Route 25, an unsigned legislative route extending from Whitesboro to Albany by way of the southern portion of Adirondack Park. From Saratoga Springs to Albany, Route 25 used what is now NY 50, NY 146A, and U.S. Route 9. The segment of legislative Route 25 from Ballston Lake to Clifton Park was designated as NY 146A in early 1931.

Major intersections

See also

References

External links

146A
Transportation in Saratoga County, New York